Leandro Lopes Luiz (born January 24, 1984), best known as Leandro Lopes, is a Brazilian pop rock and axé music singer and songwriter.

He rose to fame after winning the first season of the reality television show Ídolos Brazil.

Biography
Leandro Lopes was born on January 24, 1984, in Santíssimo, Rio de Janeiro, Brazil. Adopted at age 15, he played drums in a pop rock band. At 16, he segued to a frontman role and joined a pop rock and heavy metal band. He then began performing at night, partying with his best friend of 13 years.

His repertoire includes the musical inspiration from artists such as Zé Ramalho and Bruce Dickinson from Iron Maiden.

Ídolos Brazil

Overview

Lopes auditioned for the first season of Ídolos Brazil on Rio de Janeiro, Rio de Janeiro.

Performances

Career
Lopes signed a recording contract with Sony BMG, managed by SBT in July 2006, as part of his Ídolos Brazil prize package.

Por Você
Studio recording sessions for the eponymous major label debut Leandro Lopes ran in São Paulo, São Paulo, started in August 2006 and finished in September in the same year.

Leandro Lopes: Por Você was released on October 6, 2006, in Brazil, with the song "Deixo A Voz Me Levar" (English: Let The Voice Carry Me) as first single.

First Single Music Video

Filming of Leandro Lopes' first music video started around September 2006 in São Paulo, São Paulo. The video was directed by Pietro Sargentelli and first premiered on October 13, 2006, on MTV Brasil.

Rapazolla

During Carnival 2008, Leandro joined the axé music band Rapazolla as a vocalist, where he remains until today.

Discography

Studio albums

Singles

References

External links

1984 births
21st-century Brazilian male singers
21st-century Brazilian singers
Idols (TV series) winners
Living people